Andre Kurniawan Tedjono (born 7 December 1986) is an Indonesian badminton player who specializes in singles. Tedjono joined the PB Djarum club in 1998.

Career
While still in his teens Tedjono won the Indonesian (closed) national men's singles title in 2003 and 2005. His best international results thus far are victories in the 2007 New Zealand Open and the 2008 Dutch Open. 2008 Tedjono won the Indonesia International.

Achievements

BWF Grand Prix (2 titles, 2 runners-up) 
The BWF Grand Prix had two levels, the BWF Grand Prix and Grand Prix Gold. It was a series of badminton tournaments sanctioned by the Badminton World Federation (BWF) which was held from 2007 to 2017.

Men's singles

  BWF Grand Prix Gold tournament
  BWF Grand Prix tournament

BWF International Challenge/Series (9 titles, 6 runners-up) 
Men's singles

  BWF International Challenge tournament
  BWF International Series tournament

References

External links
 

1986 births
Living people
People from Magelang
Sportspeople from Central Java
Indonesian male badminton players